Giuseppe Loiacono (born 6 October 1991) is an Italian football player. He plays for Reggina.

Club career
He made his Serie C debut for Foggia on 30 August 2014 in a game against Martina Franca.

On 30 July 2019, he signed a 3-year contract with Reggina.

References

External links
 

1991 births
Footballers from Bari
Living people
Italian footballers
Paganese Calcio 1926 players
Calcio Foggia 1920 players
Reggina 1914 players
Serie B players
Serie C players
Serie D players
Association football defenders